The Roman Catholic Diocese of Liepāja is a diocese located in the city of Liepāja in the Ecclesiastical province of Riga in Latvia.

History
 8 May 1937: Established as Diocese of Liepāja from the Archdiocese of Riga
 2 December 1995: Lost territory to new Diocese of Jelgava

Leadership
 Bishops of Liepāja (Roman rite)
 Antonijs Urbšs (29 Apr 1938 – 11 Aug 1965)
 Pēteris Strods (Apostolic Administrator 25 Jul 1947 – 5 Aug 1960)
 Julijans Vaivods (Apostolic Administrator 10 Nov 1964 – 24 May 1990)
 Jānis Cakuls (Apostolic Administrator 23 May 1990 – 8 May 1991)
 Jānis Bulis (8 May 1991 – 7 Dec 1995)
 Ārvaldis Andrejs Brumanis (7 Dec 1995 – 12 May 2001)
 Vilhelms Toms Marija Lapelis, O.P. (12 May 2001 – 20 June 2012)
 Viktors Stulpins (7 September 2013 – present)

See also
Roman Catholicism in Latvia

Sources
 GCatholic.org
 Catholic Hierarchy
 Diocese website

References

Liepāja
Roman Catholic dioceses in Latvia
Christian organizations established in 1937
Roman Catholic dioceses and prelatures established in the 20th century
1937 establishments in Latvia